Periploca hostiata is a moth in the family Cosmopterigidae. It was described by Ronald W. Hodges in 1969. It is found in North America, where it has been recorded in Washington, California and Arizona.

The wingspan is about 8.3 mm. The head, thorax and forewings are shining gray black. The hindwings are yellow white. Adults have been recorded on wing in July.

References

Moths described in 1969
Chrysopeleiinae
Taxa named by Ronald W. Hodges
Moths of North America